In the President's Secret Service: Behind the Scenes with Agents in the Line of Fire and the Presidents They Protect is a book by New York Times bestselling author Ronald Kessler, published on August 4, 2009, detailing the United States Secret Service involvement in protecting the president of the United States. The book is based on interviews with more than 100 current and former secret service agents.

The book reveals that during Barack Obama's term the threats on the life of the president increased by 400% compared to his predecessor. Also, Obama has not given up smoking according to the agents interviewed to the book – contrary to what the public has believed after Obama said not to be smoking in the White House at the beginning of his term. The book also makes numerous other previously unpublicized allegations about the personal life of many 20th century United States presidents and their families, as related by their personal security personnel.

The book was reviewed positively by Newsweek.

References 

Books about Barack Obama
Works about the United States Secret Service
Books about American law enforcement agencies

2009 non-fiction books